Hemiramphus is a genus of schooling marine fish commonly called halfbeaks, garfish, or ballyhoos, and are members of the family Hemiramphidae. They inhabit the surface of warm temperate and tropical sea, and feed on algae, plankton, and smaller fish. Hemiramphus species are edible but are more important as food fish for larger predatory species including dolphinfish and billfish.

Species

There are currently 12 recognized species in this genus:
 Hemiramphus archipelagicus Collette & Parin, 1978 (Jumping halfbeak)
 Hemiramphus balao Lesueur, 1821 (Balao halfbeak)
 Hemiramphus bermudensis Collette, 1962 (Bermuda halfbeak)
 Hemiramphus brasiliensis (Linnaeus, 1758) (Ballyhoo halfbeak)
 Hemiramphus bruuni (Parin, Collette & Shcherbachev, 1980)
 Hemiramphus convexus M. C. W. Weber & de Beaufort, 1922
 Hemiramphus depauperatus Lay & E. T. Bennett, 1839 (Tropical halfbeak)
 Hemiramphus far (Forsskål, 1775) (Blackbarred halfbeak)
 Hemiramphus lutkei Valenciennes, 1847 (Lutke's halfbeak)
 Hemiramphus marginatus (Forsskål, 1775) (Yellowtip halfbeak)
 Hemiramphus robustus Günther, 1866 (Three-by-two garfish)
 Hemiramphus saltator C. H. Gilbert & Starks, 1904 (Longfin halfbeak)

References

 
Hemiramphidae
Taxa named by Georges Cuvier
Marine fish genera